Hood is a populated place situated in New Hope, a borough in Bucks County, Pennsylvania, United States. Near the settlement are Aquetong Creek and New Hope and Ivyland Railroad. The site features ruins of the Robert Heath Mills, a grist mill built in the early 1700s. The original name of this community was Springdale.

See also
Springdale Historic District (New Hope, Pennsylvania)

References

Unincorporated communities in Bucks County, Pennsylvania
Unincorporated communities in Pennsylvania